Senator Semmes may refer to:

Benedict Joseph Semmes (1789–1863), Maryland State Senate
Samuel Middleton Semmes (1811–1867), Maryland State Senate